Lintneria arthuri is a moth of the  family Sphingidae. It is known from Bolivia.

The wingspan is about 114 mm. Adults are on wing in November and December.

The larvae probably feed on Lamiaceae (such as Salvia), Hydrophylloideae (such as Wigandia) and Verbenaceae species (such as Lantana).

References

Lintneria
Moths described in 1897